Datang Youxia Zhuan is a wuxia novel by Liang Yusheng first published as a serial between 1 January 1963 and 14 June 1964 in the Hong Kong newspaper Ta Kung Pao. The first part of a trilogy, the novel is followed by Longfeng Baochai Yuan and Huijian Xinmo.

Plot 
The novel is set in China during the Tianbao era (742–756) of the Tang dynasty. Emperor Xuanzong appoints Yang Guozhong as chancellor because his cousin, Yang Yuhuan, is the emperor's favourite concubine. Nepotism and corruption become widespread in the Tang government as Yang Guozhong and his relatives and supporters dominate the political scene. Meanwhile, An Lushan wins the emperor's trust through flattery and gets promoted to military governor of Fanyang. He covertly builds up his forces in preparation for a rebellion against the Tang government.

In the wulin (martial artists' community), Dou Lingkan and Wang Botong compete fiercely for the position of chief of the wulin. Dou Lingkan and his brothers have the support of Duan Guizhang, a renowned swordsman who is also Dou's brother-in-law. On the other hand, Wang Botong forms a secret alliance with An Lushan, recruits many followers, and sends his children to be trained by martial arts experts.

Duan Guizhang maintains a close friendship with Shi Yiru, a former bureaucrat. Their wives give birth to a boy, Duan Keye, and a girl, Shi Ruomei, respectively. When An Lushan sends his men to bring Duan Guizhang to meet him, Duan is not in at the time, so Shi Yiru goes in his place and ends up being detained by An Lushan. After Duan Guizhang finds out, he brings along Tie Mole, Dou Lingkan's godson, to An Lushan's base to rescue Shi Yiru. They fail in their mission; Shi Yiru is killed while Duan Guizhang sustains serious injuries. Luckily for them, they are saved by Nan Jiyun and Huangfu Song.

Kongkong'er, one of Wang Botong's followers, kidnaps the baby Duan Keye and uses him as a hostage to force Duan Guizhang to withdraw his support for Dou Lingkan. Eventually, Dou Lingkan is killed by Wang Yanyu, Wang Botong's daughter, in a fight and the Dous are massacred by the Wangs. With Nan Jiyun's help, Tie Mole escapes and vows to avenge his godfather. Duan Guizhang then sends Tie Mole to learn martial arts from Bu Anqi, a reclusive master.

Seven years later, after Tie Mole has achieved a high level of mastery in martial arts, he returns to the wulin and finds himself caught up in the chaos of a rebellion started by An Lushan. He embarks on a series of adventures, undermining the rebels by capturing Wang Botong's stronghold, and exposing the truth behind a 20-year-old mystery and helping to clear Huangfu Song's name. At the same time, he gets entangled in a love triangle with Wang Yanyu, whom he has fallen in love with even though she killed his godfather; and Han Zhifen, another maiden he meets on his adventures.

At one point, Tie Mole saves Emperor Xuanzong and flees with him after the capital cities Luoyang and Chang'an fall to the rebels. He is also involved in the incident at Mawei courier station – the discontented Tang soldiers blame Yang Guozhong for their plight, kill him, and force Emperor Xuanzong to execute Yang Yuhuan. The emperor holds a grudge against Tie Mole, thinking that he is responsible for Yang Yuhuan's death, and attempts to kill him but Tie Mole manages to escape.

The Siege of Suiyang is featured in the later chapters and many heroes, including Nan Jiyun, sacrifice themselves to defend the city from the rebel forces. Tie Mole, Han Zhifen and the other survivors continue their legacy by recruiting heroes to assist the Tang government in suppressing the rebellion.

Characters

Adaptations 
In 2008 the novel was adapted into a Chinese television series titled Paladins in Troubled Times by producer Zhang Jizhong. It starred Victor Huang, Shen Xiaohai, He Zhuoyan, Liu Tianyue, Tae and Lu Chen.

References 

 

1964 novels
Novels by Liang Yusheng
Novels set in the Tang dynasty